is a Japanese voice actress from Aichi Prefecture, Japan. She is affiliated with I'm Enterprise.

Early life
Takeda's father is third-generation Japanese-Brazilian. Her maternal surname is Takeda, her paternal surname is Tago, her personal name is Larissa, and the Brazilian name is generally "personal name + maternal name + paternal name", thus her name is Larissa Tago Takeda.

Filmography

Anime
2017
Aikatsu Stars! as Girl, Stella (eps 65-66)
Kino's Journey - the Beautiful World- as Child B (ep 11)
Love Live! Sunshine!! as Female student
My Girlfriend Is Shobitch as Shizuku Ariyama
The Idolmaster Cinderella Girls Theater 2nd Season as Yuzu Kitami (ep 6)
2018
Basilisk: The Ōka Ninja Scrolls as Child, boy
Butlers: Chitose Momotose Monogatari as Woman
Chio's School Road as Miyama's Girlfriend
Golden Kamuy as Children (ep 3)
Gundam Build Divers as Suu
Hanebado! as Suzu Shiraishi (eps 4-5)
Happy Sugar Life as Part-Timer Girl (ep 1), Sumire Miyazaki (eps 2, 4-5)
Persona 5 the Animation as Female visitor B (ep 6)
The Disastrous Life of Saiki K. as Female student A
2019
Bermuda Triangle: Colorful Pastrale as Sonata
2020
Magia Record as classmate
Yashahime: Princess Half-Demon as Hisui (baby)
Akudama Drive as Audience
Talentless Nana as Student
2022
Shadowverse Flame as Ren Kazamatsuri

OVA
My Girlfriend is Shobitch as Shizuku Ariyama

ONA
2017
The Idolmaster Cinderella Girls Theater (Web) 2nd Season as Yuzu Kitami (ep 9)
Yakiniku-ten Sengoku as Aoi Shachigashira

Anime Film
2018
Penguin Highway as Ono-san

Video games
2017
Formation Girls as Ririko Tomohata
Hoshi no Liberion as Cadmos
Shirohime Quest Kyoku as Nagahama Castle, Murakami Castle
The Idolmaster Cinderella Girls as Yuzu Kitami
The Idolmaster Cinderella Girls: Starlight Stage as Yuzu Kitami
Tsuyokute NEW GAME as Tomoe, Nia
2018
Anata no Shikihime Kyoudoutan as Monomaria
Abyss Horizon as Kodaka, Charger, Arkansas
23/7 Twenty Three Seven as Sigurd Riva
Katana Maidens ~ Toji No Miko: Kizamishi Issen no Tomoshibi as Sawano Fukuda
Cuisine Dimension as Omurice
2020
Azur Lane as Marblehead
Last Period as Lao

Drama CD
Uchi no Ko no Tame Naraba, Ore wa Moshikashitara Maou mo Taoseru Kamoshirenai as Chloe Schneider

References

External links
 Official agency profile 
 

Living people
Voice actresses from Aichi Prefecture
Japanese people of Brazilian descent
Japanese video game actresses
Japanese voice actresses
Year of birth missing (living people)
I'm Enterprise voice actors